Neuroxena rectilineata is a moth of the subfamily Arctiinae first described by Hervé de Toulgoët in 1972. It is found on Mayotte in the Comoro Islands.

References

 

Nyctemerina